The Carleton Place Jr. Canadians are a Junior ice hockey team based in Carleton Place, Ontario, Canada.  They play in the Eastern Ontario Junior Hockey League (CCHL2). The team was initially founded in 1980 as the Clarence Beavers  based in Clarence, Ontario who played in the Eastern Ontario Junior Hockey League.

History
In 2008, the strangest events took place during the Eastern Ontario Junior B Hockey League playoffs opening round against the Ottawa West Golden Knights. Clarence won the series 4-3, but game 7 was voided and had to be replayed because of an officiating error. Clarence Beavers fans dubbed the replay game 7 as "Game 8". Ottawa West won the replayed game and the series 4-3. The series loss was a bitter pill to swallow for the Clarence Beavers hockey club.

In 2017 the Clarence Beaver franchise was purchased by the Carleton Place Canadians (CCHL) and re-located and renamed to the Carleton Place Jr. Canadians in the CCHL2 league as part of their developmental model.

Season-by-season results

Notable alumni
Benoît Pouliot

External links
Carleton Place Jr B Canadians webpage
EOJHL Webpage

Eastern Ontario Junior B Hockey League teams
Clarence-Rockland
Ice hockey clubs established in 1980
1980 establishments in Ontario